Marc Borghans (born 1 April 1960) is a former Dutch middle- and long-distance runner. He competed in the 1988 European Athletics Indoor Championships and two editions of the World Athletics Cross Country Championships (1984 and 1987).

Marc and his wife, Milenka, sister of Moré Galetovic, live in Chicago with their son, Roberto.

References 

1960 births
Living people
People from Beek
Dutch male cross country runners
Dutch male long-distance runners
Dutch male middle-distance runners
Clemson Tigers men's track and field athletes
Sportspeople from Limburg (Netherlands)
20th-century Dutch people